
Gmina Żarki is an urban-rural gmina (administrative district) in Myszków County, Silesian Voivodeship, in southern Poland.

Villages
Apart from the town of Żarki, Gmina Żarki contains the villages and settlements of Czatachowa, Jaroszów, Jaworznik, Kotowice, Masłoniowizna, Ostrów, Przybynów, Skrobaczowizna, Suliszowice, Wysoka Lelowska, Zaborze and Zawada.

Neighbouring gminas
Gmina Żarki is bordered by the town of Myszków and by the gminas of Janów, Niegowa, Olsztyn, Poraj and Włodowice.

References

Zarki
Myszków County